This is a discography of the Australian alternative rock band The Vines.

Albums

Studio albums

Compilations
The Best of The Vines (March 11, 2008)

Demos and EPs
Demo (2001, handed out at gigs during a tour with You Am I in 2001)
Mixes (2001, unmastered album)
This Is Not The Vines Album (2002, 6-track EP)
College EP (2002, US 5-track promo CD)

Singles

Notes
 A ^ Limited edition (1,000 copies) 7" vinyl release.
 B ^ 7" vinyl promo.
 C ^ Australian-only release.
 D ^ Radio and video-only promo.
 E ^ Video-only promo.
 F ^ Radio-only promo.

Soundtracks
I Am Sam (2002, covered "I'm Only Sleeping" by The Beatles)
No Man's Woman (2007, covered "4ever" by The Veronicas)
Bruce Almighty (2003, song "Outtathaway!")
Kicking & Screaming (2005, song "Ride")
Guitar Hero 6 (2011, song "Get Free")
Agent Cody Banks (2003, song "Get Free")
Flat Out 2 (2006, song "Don't Listen to the Radio")
Far Cry 5 (2018, song "Get Free")

Covers
Apart from songs by various bands on compilations and at their early shows, The Vines have also covered two songs by hip hop duo Outkast.

An acoustic cover of "Ms. Jackson" was released as a B-side on their 2002 single, "Outtathaway!". The rap verses are not sung, leaving it with just the chorus and bridge.
"So Fresh, So Clean" was performed at the Big Day Out, an Australian music festival, in early 2007.

References

Discographies of Australian artists
Vines, The